Jab We Met is a 2007 Indian Hindi-language romantic comedy film written and directed by Imtiaz Ali and produced by Dhilin Mehta under his banner Shree Ashtavinayak Cine Vision. The film stars Shahid Kapoor and Kareena Kapoor in their fourth film together with Tarun Arora, Saumya Tandon, and Dara Singh Randhawa in supporting roles. Primarily based in Mumbai, Bhatinda, and Shimla, the film tells the story of Aditya Kashyap (Shahid), a heartbroken businessman who walks out of his corporate business and boards a train bound for Delhi where he meets another passenger, a talkative Punjabi girl Geet Dhillon (Kareena). She is sent off aboard when he gets off the train, but both end up being left behind. Beginning their journey together, she tries to have him accompany her to her residence in Bhatinda and then to elope with her boyfriend Anshuman Singh (Arora) while planning to get him married to her sister Roop Dhillon (Tandon).

The film received critical acclaim since its release. The film was among the top-grossing Hindi films of the year. Released in the United Kingdom a day before its worldwide release of 25 October 2007, Jab We Met became a hit at the Indian box office as well as overseas. Ashtavinayak later announced that Jab We Met would be remade by MoserBaer in four other Indian languages: Tamil, Telugu, Kannada, and Malayalam. However, eventually, it was remade only in Tamil as Kanden Kadhalai with a subsequent Telugu dubbed version titled Priya Priyathama.

The film fetched several awards, among which was a National Film Award for Best Female Playback Singer awarded to Shreya Ghoshal for the song Yeh Ishq Haaye, which remained a chartbuster for many weeks.

Plot

Aditya Kashyap, heir to a wealthy but broken family, is depressed and suicidal as he walks out of an important company meeting. He wanders aimlessly and boards a random train where he meets another passenger, Geet Dhillon, a jovial and talkative young girl. Deeply lost in his thoughts, Aditya gets off the train at a random station. Geet tries to get him back aboard as the train is about to leave. But both end up being left behind. They reach the next station via a cab to catch the train, but they miss it again when she picks a fight with a vendor.

As she wanders alone in the station, she is harassed by the same vendor and then approached by a man on a motorbike who believes her to be a call girl. She spots Aditya in a distance and runs to strike up a conversation. The man on the motorbike leaves her alone thinking she is with Aditya. Geet blames Aditya for the mess and insists he accompany her to her home in Bhatinda. Aditya agrees to it. They put up at a cheap local hotel for the night where he opens up to her about how his girlfriend ditched him to marry someone else. Geet wins him over with her theory of self-love and he lets go of his reserved nature. She tells him of her plan to elope with her boyfriend Anshuman because her family won't accept their marriage due to religious differences. The next morning, they set out for Bhatinda and bond along the way. He tells her that he's the heir to a late wealthy industrialist, Dharamraj Kashyap. He further confides his company's financial troubles to her. And also discusses his mother's extramarital affair and subsequent elopement issues. 

At Geet's house, her relatives are immensely grateful to him for bringing her back and ask him to stay with them for a week. Her grandfather, Suryendra suspects they share something more than friendship but they both deny it. Her family decides to fix her wedding but an uninterested Geet pretends to be in love with Aditya to and drives away the groom. She runs away from her house the very night and plans to see Anshuman. Aditya tries to dissuade her fearing her family will suspect him and get him arrested. She however convinces him to help her elope. The two of them arrive in Manali, Himachal Pradesh, where Anshuman stays. She tries to take Aditya along to introduce him to her fiancé but he bids farewell so as not to get his heart broken because he had fallen in love with her.

Nine months later, Aditya is shown to have successfully revived his company's financial status. He now enjoys a renewed optimism towards life. He has also reconciled with his mother and gave back her position in the company. Geet's family sees him in a brand launch event on TV. Her uncle locates his office and confronts him as to why Geet never returned home after they eloped. Although he's unaware of her whereabouts, Aditya promises to bring her back in the next ten days. He returns to Manali where he learns that Anshuman had turned down her proposal because he had no plans of getting married.

Aditya traces her to Shimla where she is leading a quiet life as a schoolteacher in her former school. He notices that she has changed and has become numb to emotions just like how he was few months back. He takes her to a hotel and advises her to let it all out by rebuking Anshuman for his actions. She hurls abuses at him over the phone and as they go on to share an intimate hug in the hit of the moment. The next day, Geet realises Aditya is in love with her. When asked, he admits it but also assures her that his feelings won't ever get in the way of their friendship or affect their lives. Meanwhile, Anshuman attempts to start afresh. Uncertain about him, the three of them leave for Bhatinda together. Her family is still under the impression that she had eloped with Aditya and she repeatedly fails to tell them the truth. Geet is also confused about her feelings for Aditya and therefore she meets him at night so that he can help her understand if she loves him or Anshuman. Aditya advises her to talk to Anshuman the next morning.

The next day, Aditya sets out on his way back home after uniting Geet and Anshuman in private. Anshuman tells her about their plans to marry. As a train passes by, Anshuman's words get drowned out by the noise of the train. Geet realizes that she loves Aditya and not Anshuman. She runs to Aditya, confesses her love and the two of them share a passionate kiss. Anshuman leaves the scene confused and hurt. Their wedding takes place with their families' blessings. They are shown to have two daughters. The film ends with Suryendra telling his two great-granddaughters about how 'mischievous' their parents were and how knew they were in love all along. Geet and Aditya nod in agreement as they share a smile.

Cast 

 Shahid Kapoor as Aditya Dharamraj Kashyap
 Kareena Kapoor as Geet Kaur Dhillon 
 Tarun Arora as Anshuman Singh (Geet's former boyfriend) 
 Saumya Tandon as Roop Kaur Dhillon (Geet's sister) 
 Dara Singh Randhawa as Suryendra Singh Dhillon (Geet's grandfather) 
 Pavan Malhotra as Prem Singh Dhillon (Geet's uncle)
 Kamal Tiwari as Gurpreet Singh Dhillon (Geet's father) 
 Kiran Juneja as Amrit Kaur Dhillon (Geet's mother)
 Pravin Purva as Sarabjit Kaur Dhillon (Geet's grandmother) 
 Veer Pratap Singh as Manjeet Singh Maan (Geet's suitor)
 Divya Seth as Ayesha Khanna (Aditya's mother & Dharamraj's ex wife)
 K.F. Jussawala as Advocate Shrikant Sharma (Ayesha's lawyer)  
 Nihar Thakkar as Raghav Dutta (Aditya's subordinate) 
 Vishal Om Sharma as Advocate Rohit Bhosle (Aditya's lawyer) 
 Kishore Pradhan as Station Master (Special Appearance) 
 Brijendra Kala as Taxi Driver (Special Appearances)

Production 
Pre-production work on the film began in early 2007 when Shree Ashtavinayak Cine Vision Limited announced that director Imtiaz Ali would be directing the then real-life couple Shahid and Kareena Kapoor in their first "full-fledged romantic drama".

When Ali began casting for the film, Preity Zinta and Bobby Deol were his first choices to portray Dhillon and Kashyap respectively but were eventually replaced by Kareena Kapoor and Shahid Kapoor respectively, the former when Zinta refused to do the film. On the two lead actors, Ali commented, "I wanted a girl who could look natural in scenes where she misses the train. She had to be without make-up, someone who could be hyper, talkative and interesting but not irritating. I was never a fan of her [Kareena] and hadn't seen too many of her flicks, but I just knew Kareena was perfect as Geet [...] [On the other hand], When I met him [Shahid], I realised he wasn't the forgettable actor that he comes across in several of his movies. He has gone through a lot in life and that maturity had never been brought out. He was perfect for the role of a young, mature, quiet guy."

The film was shot throughout the Punjab region, and filming started on 20 March 2007 in Chandigarh and later headed to Shimla and Manali, where the crew filmed a song on the Himalayas and the Rohtang Pass. Manish Malhotra served as the costume designer. The summer shots in Punjab of the haveli were filmed in Nabha near Patiala. While shooting the last schedule of the film in Mumbai, sources had indicated that the lead pair had broken up. Though the media projected it as a publicity stunt for the film, it was later confirmed that the couple had indeed parted ways. The title of the film was decided by a popular vote; moviegoers had a choice between Punjab Mail, Ishq Via Bhatinda ('Love via Bhatinda') and Jab We Met.

To promote the film, the actors appeared separately on different television shows. Kareena Kapoor appeared as guest judge on the singing talent contest Sa Re Ga Ma Pa Challenge 2007 whilst Shahid Kapoor appeared on Amul STAR Voice of India and Jhalak Dikhhla Jaa; they later appeared together on the television show Nach Baliye. Apart from this, the producers also painted two full local trains in Mumbai from the Western and Central lines with Jab We Met imagery, where Shahid Kapoor chatted up with fellow passengers and informed them about the movie. On the night of 23 October 2007, a special preview of the film was organized at Yash Raj Studios in Mumbai for those associated with the film and their families.

Release 
The film was released in UK on 25 October 2007, and was released on 26 October 2007 in India.

Home media
Moserbaer served as the DVD partner and regional distributor for Jab We Met. On 7 December 2007, the film was officially released on DVD in the U.S., U.K., UAE and other international markets. A single disc collector's item in an enclosed box with the DVD containing English, Portuguese, Arabic, and Spanish subtitles was also released.

Reception

Box office 
The film opened with a opening of 70% all over India on 26 October 2007 and later increased to 90% during the weekend. Making a total first week net business of 11.75 crores from 350 cinemas, the film went into the second week with very strong collections and saw a massive increase with 40%-50% increment in shows worldwide.

During its third week, Jab We Met managed to add another  to its collections but suffered a setback due to the arrival of Farah Khan's Om Shanti Om and Sanjay Leela Bhansali's Saawariya, which resulted in the number of shows for the film being reduced. Due to popular demand and the poor performance of the latter, the following week saw an increase in the number of prints for the film across the country, and resulted in a 50% increase of the film's collections. Completing fifty successful days at the box office on 14 December 2007, the film received a hit status by BoxOffice India and continued running successfully in cinemas with greater number of shows than the much later-released, Om Shanti Om. 

By February 2008, Jab We Met had made a net business of over ₹310 million (US$10.9million), and emerged as one of the biggest hits of the year. On 30 January 2008, it was announced that to celebrate the success of its 100 days run at the box office, PVR Cinemas in Delhi would have a special screening of the film on Valentine's Day.

Meanwhile, Jab We Met also opened well internationally especially in the U.K., where it was released a day before its worldwide release of 26 October. Debuting at number 10 in the U.K., the film grossed £11,488 on its previews night and £144,525 on its opening weekend, collecting a total of £156,013 from 31 screens. The film continued to do strong business and garnered excellent collections during its second week, making a two-week total of £325,996. Over the next five weeks, Jab We Met collected a total of £43,529 from 54 screens and made a grand total of £424,681.

Critical response 
Upon release, the film opened to positive reviews. Critics praised the film for its simplicity, its romance, saying that it was "one of the finest romantic films to come out of Bollywood in 2007". The film's direction and performances were particularly appreciated.

Taran Adarsh from indiaFM gave the film a 3.5 out of 5 rating saying it is "as refreshing as an ice-cold watermelon juice in scorching heat." Subhash K. Jha wrote, "...Jab We Met is the kind of cinematic experience that is hard to come by in this day and age of smoky cynicism and borrowed rage." Rajeev Masand from CNN-IBN, who gave the film 3 stars out of 5, described it as "a film bursting with the kind of lovely little moments that'll bring a smile to your face. Khaled Mohamed, of the Hindustan Times, gave the film 3 out of 5 stars, saying the film, "is quite a delight, particularly for the chirpy-chirpy-cheep-cheep girl and the retentive, moan-groan boy. Directed with a flair for garnishing even the most abject of circumstances with humour and irony, here’s a feel-cool movie. Wonderful.

The Times of India gave the film 4 out of 5 stars concluding, "The film belongs to Shahid and Kareena who pitch in memorable performances and lend a whole new meaning to the boy-meets-girl story." Joginder Tuteja from indiaglitz.com gave the film 3.5 out of 5 stars, described it as "Shahid-Kareena's DDLJ", and concluded that "...it would be a pain if any of the two actors do not get awarded and rewarded for their performances..."

Reviews towards the director, Imtiaz Ali, were favourable as well. Indiatimes wrote, "After his much appreciated Socha Na Tha (2004), Imtiaz goes bigger and better and the result is nothing but flying colours".

Most critics agreed that the main highlight of the film was the leading pair and Shahid and Kareena's chemistry. Rajeev Masand further explained, "The real magic of this film lies in the performances of its two main leads who seize your attention from the moment they first appear on screen." Taran Adarsh commented, "Shahid delivers his career-best performance in Jab We Met... Kareena is in top form as well. Jab We Met is a turning point in her career. Fantabulous -- that's the right word to describe her work this time. The confidence with which she handles the contrasting characterization speaks volumes. This film should do for her what Kuch Kuch Hota Hai (1998) did for Kajol." Subhash K. Jha approved the chemistry as well, "...there are sparks...and the ones between Kareena and Shahid are so unselfconsciously genuine that you end up looking at the characters rather than the two actors going through a series of brilliantly conceived and energized incidents..."

Apart from critics, Jab We Met was one of the Best film of 2007 according to various Bollywood movie directors such as Madhur Bhandarkar, David Dhawan, Rakeysh Omprakash Mehra, Anurag Basu, and Sriram Raghavan.

Music

The score was composed and produced by Sanjoy Chowdhury. The film featured songs composed by Pritam Chakraborty with lyrics by Irshad Kamil. The film's soundtrack was released on 21 September 2007 by lead actress, Kareena Kapoor on the musical show Sa Re Ga Ma Pa Challenge 2007.

Joginder Tuteja from IndiaFM gave the music 3.5 out of 5 stars saying, "In 2007, Pritam may have been come up with good music in number of films [...] But if there is one album that impresses most after Life in a... Metro and turns out to be the most satisfying experience, it is Jab We Met. The album is a perfect example of how to get a quality soundtrack which mixes songs for different segments of audience." Movietalkies.com rated the album 4 out of 5 stars, describing the album as "certainly one of the better albums that have come out this year ... Pritam has shown a depth and width of imagination in the manner in which he has used so many different genres and mixed them together to create a fascinating journey of music."

The film's soundtrack debuted at number 8 and later jumped up to number 5 during its second week. Over the next several weeks, the album steadily began climbing up the music charts and saw the album sales increase after the film's release. During the week of 19 November the album replaced the soundtrack of Om Shanti Om and moved up to number 1 but fell back to number 2 the following week. Despite competition from the release of newer soundtracks, the album stayed at the top for over nine weeks. According to the Indian trade website Box Office India, with around 19,00,000 units sold, this film's soundtrack album was the year's second highest-selling.

Jab We Met soundtrack was featured on Rediff's and IndiaFM's year-end list of 2007's Top 10 Music Albums.

Awards and nominations 
Below is a complete list showing the awards and nominations Jab We Met received:

Legacy 
Jab We Met remains one of the most popular romantic films in Bollywood. It brought recognition to Shahid Kapoor and Kareena Kapoor, both had enjoyed only limited success in their previous films. The couple was named in Bollywood Hungamas list of the top 10 best romantic couples of the decade. Yahoo! Movies India listed the film as one of the Bollywood's top 10 most romantic movies. The film was remade in Tamil as Kanden Kadhalai. The film's plot also inspired the television show Love U Zindagi.

Kapoor's character, Geet Dhillon, became a popular and recognizable character. She later went on to say about her role, "To play a character like 'Geet' doesn't happen all the time; it just happens. When you begin working on a film, you of course know about the story and your character. However, no one knows how audiences would eventually react to it. 'Geet' did strike a chord with the audiences and became a household name."

Kareena Kapoor, for her performance, was ranked number 66 in Filmfare magazine's 80 Iconic Bollywood Performances list. According to Hindi Film News, she was number 5 in the critic's top ten and number 4 in the popular top ten for the finest performance by a Bollywood actress for the decade. She was also named by Rediff as one of Bollywood's most beloved characters.

References

External links 

 
 

2007 films
2000s Hindi-language films
2000s road comedy-drama films
Indian road comedy-drama films
Films directed by Imtiaz Ali
Films shot in Himachal Pradesh
Films set in Himachal Pradesh
Indian romantic comedy-drama films
2007 romantic comedy-drama films
Hindi films remade in other languages
Films shot in Punjab, India
Films shot in Mumbai
Films featuring songs by Pritam
Films shot in Mandawa
Films set in Manali, Himachal Pradesh
Films scored by Sanjoy Chowdhury
Films featuring a Best Choreography National Film Award-winning choreography
2007 comedy films
2007 drama films